María Mercedes is a Mexican telenovela produced by Valentín Pimstein for Televisa in 1992. It was the first of the "Marías" telenovela trilogy, being followed by Marimar and María la del Barrio. María Mercedes is remake on the telenovela Rina which in turn is based on the radionovela Enamorada by Inés Rodena.

Thalía and Arturo Peniche starred as protagonists, while Laura Zapata starred as main antagonist. Fernando Ciangherotti starred as special participation.

Plot 
Maria Mercedes is a poor young woman who lives with her father and three siblings after being abandoned by her ambitious mother. Because of the lack of support from her perennially drunk father, she is forced to raise her brothers and sister on her own, working in the streets of Mexico City selling lottery tickets and juggling in a clown costume.

Santiago del Olmo is very sick and knows that he is dying. One morning when he is in the garden, he sees María selling lottery tickets in the street. He comes up with the idea to marry her just to upset his avaricious aunt Malvina after his death as a personal revenge. He gains Maria's trust and friendship, proposes to her, and she agrees.

When Santiago dies, María becomes the head of the family, making Malvina's ire burn stronger. According to Santiago's will, Malvina, her son Jorge Luis, and her daughter Digna must live there in his house with Maria if they want to inherit any of his fortune.

Since the murder of his wife on their wedding day, Jorge Luis has become a pessimistic young man, in contrast to his younger sister, Digna, who is a very religious and fearful woman, and who has never dated a man.

After María moves into the del Olmo household, she falls in love with Jorge Luis, who is weak and does not oppose his mother's will, always doing as she wants. Malvina makes it her life's mission to antagonize María. When she finds out that María loves her son, she pushes him to marry her in order to get the inheritance back.

She plans that after a few weeks Jorge Luis could make Maria give him control over the whole fortune and after that get divorced. Jorge Luis and María get married but they do not share a room nor do they live like a traditional married couple. Over time, Jorge Luis starts to develop a real and passionate love for María. Unfortunately María has another foe, Mistica, a sultry and selfish woman who used to be Jorge Luis' girlfriend, but then left him heartbroken in order to marry a wealthy older man, Sebastian Ordoñez. She realizes that she still loves Jorge Luis and is furious to learn that he is married and falling in love with Maria. She promises herself that she will get Jorge Luis back and starts to help Malvina get rid of María.

María then meets Maria Magnolia, a beautiful, rich, and sophisticated woman who is revealed to be her real mother. Maria Magnolia has now remarried and has another son, but she deeply regrets having left her family. She gains María's trust and starts to help her children, especially Guillermo who is in jail and is the only one who knows the truth about her.

Maria Magnolia's true identity remains a secret however for María and her other siblings, Rosario and Andres, and all the things she does for them have to be hidden from her new husband, Rodolfo (an architect who is Rosario's boss and is also a friend of Jorge Luis' family) and their son Gustavito (who is the youngest half-brother of Guillermo, Maria Mercedes, Rosario and Andres).

Maria Magnolia teaches María good manners and how to seduce her husband. Not long after, Sebastian Ordoñes throws a high class party where he gives a prize to Jorge Luis and then tries to seduce María. Jorge Luis, moved by jealousy and by the sight of the beautifully well-dressed María, finally starts to fall for her and sleeps with her. Soon María learns that she is pregnant.

After María's father passes away, she and Jorge Luis go on a vacation that goes terribly awry because of the intervention of both Mistica and a local lifeguard who hits on María. Jorge Luis impulsively makes up his mind because of this and asks María for a divorce as soon as they arrive in Mexico City.

However, Malvina has other plans. She tries to drive María crazy with the help of Cordelio, the butler, and puts her in an asylum. María manages to escape from the asylum and hides from the police in the house of Doña Filo, a good friend from her poverty-stricken days, until Jorge Luis asks the police not to pursue her any more.

With Cordelio as her ally, Malvina tries to kill María but it all fails. Malvina recognizes Maria Magnolia's influence and begins to wonder if she could be María's mother. She tells this to Magnolia's new husband, Rodolfo Mancilla, who in turn goes to María's old house (where Rosario and Andres still live) and asks to see a picture of their mother. He at once recognizes her and later confronts her, arguing with her and throwing her out. Maria Magnolia nevertheless survives by helping out a French tailor who once recognized her talent and pushed her ambitions (which clashed with the need to raise her family; she chose her career over them).

Meanwhile, Jorge Luis realizes that his feelings for Maria have grown so strong that he can’t live without her any more. He asks for forgiveness and she returns to the house where they live as a real married couple.

Nine months later María gives birth to twin girls, one of whom dies a few days later. Jorge Luis then puts an end to Mistica's interference for good after she attempts to pin a pregnancy on him (the child was actually her husband Sebastian's). When he discovers that his mother still hates María, he decides that it is time to leave his mother and raise his family with Maria.

He stands up for himself for the very first time against his mother's wishes and leaves. Malvina goes crazy and dresses as María used to in her impoverished past and runs to the street where she starts to sell lottery tickets and clean windshields. She is caught and put in an asylum.

Maria Magnolia finally decides to tell the truth to her offspring. María at first is shocked by this revelation but her resentment shatters and she accepts her mother with love. Rosario, on the other hand, is disgusted and filled with rancor, a situation that remains until Rodolfo Mancilla (who happens to be her boss), agrees to accept all of them as his step-children.

With this, the sisters make peace and Rosario finally accepts the courtship of Ricardo, a younger friend of Jorge Luis, without any remarks by María. Since María and Jorge Luis only had a civil wedding, they decide to have a great church wedding in the Basilica of Guadalupe with all their friends and relatives, closing the scene after they say "I do", thus ending the soap opera with a romantic kiss.

Cast 

 Thalía as María Mercedes "Meche" Muñoz González de del Olmo
 Arturo Peniche as Jorge Luis del Olmo Morantes
 Laura Zapata as Malvina Morantes Vda. del Olmo; Main Villain
 Gabriela Goldsmith as Maria Magnolia "Magnolia" González de Mancilla
 Carmen Amezcua as Digna del Olmo Morantes
 Carmen Salinas as Doña Filogonia
 Nicky Mondellini as Mistica Casagrande de Ordóñez
 Fernando Ciangherotti as Santiago del Olmo
 Roberto Ballesteros as Cordellio Cordero Manso
 Luis Uribe as Manuel Muñoz
 Fernando Colunga as Chicho
 Karla Álvarez as Rosario Muñoz González
 Meche Barba as Doña Chonita
 Rosa Carmina as Doña Rosa
 Jaime Moreno as Rodolfo Manzilla
 Raúl Padilla "Chóforo" as Argemiro "El Chupes" Camacho
 Luis Gimeno as Don Sebastián Ordóñez
 Roberto "Flaco" Guzmán as Teo "El Jarocho"
 Aurora Molina as Doña Natalia
 Virginia Gutiérrez as Doña Blanca Sáenz
 Jaime Lozano as Dr. Díaz
 Alberto Inzúa as Lic. Mario Portales
 Enrique Marine as Guillermo "Memo" Muñoz González
 Héctor del Puerto as Servant Lic. Portales
 Héctor Gómez as Chaplin
 Julio Urrueta as Napoleón
 Silvia Caos as Alma's nurse
 Carlos Rotzinger as Omar
 Manuel D'Flon as Lázaro
 Irma Torres as Nunny Cruz
 José Luis González y Carrasco as Joel
 Agustín López Zavala as Alberto
 Vanessa Angers as Berenice
 Marco Uriel as Adolfo
 Sylvia Campos as Diana San Román
 Evangelina Sosa as Candelaria "Candy"
 Cuco Sánchez as Genaro
 Carlos Corres as Amateo
 Marcela Figueroa as Sara
 Arturo Garcia Tenorio as Rogasiano "El Latas"
 Yula Pozo as Lucinda
 Diana Golden as Fabiola Mayerling San Roman
 Lucero Lander as Karin
 Arturo Lorca as El Mollejas
 Rebeca Manriquez as Justa
 Erika Oliva as Araceli
 Irlanda Mora as Aunt Paz
 Xavier Ximenez as Father Enrique
 Rossana San Juan as Zafiro
 Rafael del Villar as Ricardo
 Patricia Navidad as Iris
 Victor Vera as Judge Civil Registry
 Paquita la del Barrio as Paquita
 Ari Telch as Carlos Urbina
 Alfredo Gutiérrez as Dr. Arturo Valadez
 Ricardo Vera as Lic. Gómez Portales
 Elia Domenzain as Director of Academy
 Jeanette Candiani as Gloria
 Martha Zamora as Herminia
 Sara Montes as Rebeca
 María Eugenia Ríos as Director of reformatory
 Eduardo Liñán as Public Ministry Agent
 Armando Franco as Elías Carillo
 Tito Livio as El Clavo
 Jorge Granillo as El Hamburguesa
 Dolores Salomón "Bodokito" as Ludovina
 Gustavo Rojo as Dr. Pérez
 Adal Ramones as Guy Menendez 
 América as Gabriela
 Aarón Beas as Martín
 Guillermo Murray as Dr. Carvajal
 Miguel Garza as Esteban
 Paola Garera as Mirna
 Eduardo Rivera as Danilo
 José Zambrano as Lic. Robles
 David Ostrosky
 Lina Michel

Awards

Remake 

A Philippine remake aired on ABS-CBN from October 7, 2013 to January 24, 2014 as part of Primetime Bida evening block starring Jessy Mendiola (as Maria Mercedes Alegre), Jake Cuenca (as Luis Sancuevas), and Jason Abalos (as Clavio Mondejar).

References

External links

1992 telenovelas
Mexican telenovelas
1992 Mexican television series debuts
1993 Mexican television series endings
Spanish-language telenovelas
Television shows set in Mexico City
Televisa telenovelas